Tomás Cerdán de Tallada (also known as Tomàs Cerdan de Tallada) (1530–1614) was a Spanish jurist, humanist, writer and poet born in the Valencian city of Xàtiva.

Writers from the Valencian Community
16th-century Spanish judges
1530 births
1614 deaths
17th-century Spanish judges